Milson is a suburb of Palmerston North, Manawatū-Whanganui, New Zealand. The suburb is located to the north of the city, beyond the North Island Main Trunk Rail.

Milson is mostly a residential suburb with a population of 6,246 (2018). Milson is divided into a residential zone in the west and central and an industrial zone in the east.
 
Palmerston North Airport and Palmerston North railway station are in Milson.

Milson was part of the Papaioea Ward of Palmerston North City Council until 2013. It was part of the Manawatu electorate until 1996, when it became part of the Rangitikei electorate.

Many other local streets and parks have a space or US presidential theme. For example, Apollo Park has a spaced-themed playground and a butterfly park. Other parks include Colquhoun Park, John F Kennedy Park, Clearview Park, Kennedy Park, Paradise Park, Pinedale Reserve, Langley Reserve, Clearview Reserve, Jefferson Reserve and Mangaone Stream Esplanade Reserve.

History

In 1926, work began on the nearby Milson railway deviation which was to take the main trunk line out of the city centre. Earlier in the decade, the Railways Department was granted their own housing programme to combat problems in housing its workers. To service the construction of the Milson deviation, the department erected a railway settlement in the area, calling it Milson. Some 70 railway houses were built. Milson Primary School and a community centre were built to serve the workers and their families. many of these houses were sold following reforms of the railways in the late 20th century. About 60 houses remain today.

Much of the rest of the suburb was constructed after the 1950s.

Milson, and Milson Line (a main street in the suburb), are named after a historic local land owner

Demographics

It had a population of 6,246 at the 2018 New Zealand census, an increase of 264 people (4.4%) since the 2013 census, and an increase of 528 people (9.2%) since the 2006 census. There were 2,223 households. There were 3,051 males and 3,198 females, giving a sex ratio of 0.95 males per female, with 1,188 people (19.0%) aged under 15 years, 1,377 (22.0%) aged 15 to 29, 2,520 (40.3%) aged 30 to 64, and 1,161 (18.6%) aged 65 or older.

Ethnicities were 78.5% European/Pākehā, 19.6% Māori, 4.8% Pacific peoples, 10.4% Asian, and 2.3% other ethnicities (totals add to more than 100% since people could identify with multiple ethnicities).

The proportion of people born overseas was 15.8%, compared with 27.1% nationally.

Although some people objected to giving their religion, 48.7% had no religion, 38.6% were Christian, 2.0% were Hindu, 0.7% were Muslim, 0.8% were Buddhist and 2.2% had other religions.

Of those at least 15 years old, 765 (15.1%) people had a bachelor or higher degree, and 1,137 (22.5%) people had no formal qualifications. The employment status of those at least 15 was that 2,463 (48.7%) people were employed full-time, 705 (13.9%) were part-time, and 213 (4.2%) were unemployed.

Education

References

Suburbs of Palmerston North
Populated places in Manawatū-Whanganui